Deyon "Smoke" Bouie is an American football defensive back for the Georgia Bulldogs. Bouie began his college career with Texas A&M before transferring to Georgia in 2023.

High school career 
Bouie attended Bainbridge High School in Bainbridge, Georgia. During his high school career, Bouie recorded 65 total tackles and 11 interceptions, while also tallying 2,181 yards and 18 touchdowns as a wide receiver. A four-star recruit, Bouie was originally committed to Georgia, before committing to play college football at Texas A&M University.

College career

Texas A&M 
As a freshman in 2022, Bouie appeared in seven games, totaling four tackles. Bouie was suspended from a game against the Miami Hurricanes, after violating the team's curfew rules. He entered the NCAA transfer portal after the conclusion of the regular season.

Georgia 
On January 13, 2023, Bouie announced he would be transferring to the University of Georgia to play for the Georgia Bulldogs.

References

External links 

 Texas A&M Aggies bio

Living people
Texas A&M Aggies football players
Georgia Bulldogs football players
American football defensive backs
Year of birth missing (living people)